St. John's Episcopal Church is a historic Episcopal church in Roanoke, Virginia, United States.  It was built in 1891–1892, and is a Gothic style blue-gray limestone church designed by Charles M. Burns of Philadelphia. It has a nave-plan with side aisles, a corner bell tower, a sacristy wing, and a transverse chapel and narthex to the rear. The nave features a hammerbeam roof and wooden arcading and is illuminated by stained glass windows in the clerestory and side aisle walls including several by Louis Comfort Tiffany.  Attached to the church by a stone addition built in 1958, is a Tudor Revival style Parish House built in 1923.

A church history was printed during the centennial of the building.

"The Church in Roanoke" is a historical sermon, preached by invitation on the occasion of the opening of Christ Church, Roanoke, (the old St. John's Church on Church Avenue) 14 December 1902, and repeated in St. John's Church, Jefferson Street and Elm Avenue, February 8, 1914.

It was listed on the National Register of Historic Places in 1991.

References

External links 
 Saint John's Episcopal Church, South Jefferson Street & Elm Avenue, Roanoke, Roanoke City, VA: 1 photo and 1 photo caption page at Historic American Buildings Survey

19th-century Episcopal church buildings
Churches completed in 1892
Churches in Roanoke, Virginia
Episcopal churches in Virginia
Gothic Revival church buildings in Virginia
Historic American Buildings Survey in Virginia
National Register of Historic Places in Roanoke, Virginia
Churches on the National Register of Historic Places in Virginia
Tudor Revival architecture in Virginia